Prottes is a town in the district of Gänserndorf in the Austrian state of Lower Austria.

Geography

Prottes lies on the border of the Marchfeld and the Weinviertel in Lower Austria. About 7.52 percent of the municipality is forested.

References

Cities and towns in Gänserndorf District